Back Home and Broke is a lost 1922 American silent comedy film directed by Alfred E. Green and written by George Ade and J. Clarkson Miller. The film stars Thomas Meighan, Lila Lee, Frederick Burton, Cyril Ring, Charles S. Abbe, Florence Dixon, and Gertrude Quinlan. The film was released on December 24, 1922, by Paramount Pictures.

Plot
As described in a film magazine, when Tom Redding's father dies, it transpires that, instead of being one of the wealthiest citizens of the Town of Bradford, he left little except some debts, having speculated wildly. Tom (Meighan) and his mother (Gordon) are compelled to leave their old home and move into a small house. Even the factory his father owned falls into creditors' hands and Olivia Hornby (Dixon), Tom's sweetheart, discards him. Only Mary Thorne (Lee), his father's former secretary, remains faithful to Tom and his mother. As a last resource, Tom decides to go west to try and develop an oil well that Ton's father had sunk money into. Eventually he strikes oil. He meets his old college chum Billy Andrews (Wheat) who suggests that Tom return to Bradford apparently broke and thus discover who his true friends are. Their plot is developed satisfactory. Billy, posing as the representative of the millionaire Keene, buys up practically all the property in town, including the bank, newspaper, and the factory. Tom, poorly dressed, is coldly received by all save Mary, who even offers her savings to back him in a new venture. Then Billy announces that Keene will be arriving, and the people of the town turn out to welcome him. They are very surprised when the "Keene" turns out to be the despised Tom Redding. Tom gives a big dinner to his former detractors and, instead of taking revenge, announces that he will allow them to continue in control of his investments save the factory, which again displays the sign "Redding and Son." He and Mary are united.

Cast
Thomas Meighan as Tom Redding
Lila Lee as Mary Thorne
Frederick Burton as Otis Grimley
Cyril Ring	as Eustace Grimley
Charles S. Abbe as H.H. Hornby
Florence Dixon as Olivia Hornby
Gertrude Quinlan as Aggie Twaddle
Richard Carlyle as John Thorne
Maude Turner Gordon as Mrs. Redding
Larry Wheat as Billy Andrews 
Ned Burton as Horace Beemer
James Marlowe as Policeman
Eddie Borden as Collector

References

External links

1922 films
1920s English-language films
Silent American comedy films
1922 comedy films
Paramount Pictures films
Films directed by Alfred E. Green
American black-and-white films
Lost American films
American silent feature films
1922 lost films
Lost comedy films
1920s American films